The 2022 MSUK British Endurance Championship was the 11th endurance championship organised by Britcar, the third as the British Endurance Championship. The season began at Silverstone on 12 March and concluded at Donington Park on 23 October.

Calendar

Teams and drivers
Cars are assigned classed based on speed, horsepower, momentum, equipment fitted to the car and the car's model;
Class A: GT3 cars
Class B: Modern gen cup; 488 Chal. Evo, 992 Cup, ST Evo, cars
Class C: Older gen cup; 458 Chal., 991 Cup, ST, cars
Class D: GT4 cars
Class E: TCR cars
Class F: Non-homologated cars of similar performance to D and E classes

All teams are British-registered.

Race Results
Bold indicates overall winner.

Championship standings

Overall
Points are awarded as follows in all classes:

Classes
Points are awarded as follows in all classes:

Notes

References

External links

British Endurance Championship
British Endurance Championship
Britcar Endurance Championship seasons